The Cooper Union speech or address, known at the time as the Cooper Institute speech, was delivered by Abraham Lincoln on February 27, 1860, at Cooper Union, in New York City. Lincoln was not yet the Republican nominee for the presidency, as the convention was scheduled for May. It is considered one of his most important speeches. Some historians have argued that the speech was responsible for his victory in the presidential election later that year.

In the speech, Lincoln elaborated his views on slavery by affirming that he did not wish it to be expanded into the western territories and claiming that the Founding Fathers would agree with this position. The journalist Robert J. McNamara wrote, "Lincoln's Cooper Union speech was one of his longest, at more than 7,000 words. And it is not one of his speeches with passages that are often quoted. Yet, due to the careful research and Lincoln's forceful argument, it was stunningly effective."

Horace Greeley's New York Tribune hailed it as "one of the most happiest and most convincing political arguments ever made in this City. ... No man ever made such an impression on his first appeal to a New-York audience."

Background 
As 1860 dawned, Lincoln's political tides were turning. Although he had lost a chance at a Senate seat in the 1858 Illinois Senate elections, he now eyed the presidency. However, it was expected that "the office should seek the man", and Lincoln refrained from announcing his candidacy. In February of 1860, he was invited to speak at Henry Ward Beecher's church in New York, which he very excitedly accepted. Having not spoken in the East before, Lincoln was eager to make a good impression. He had a new suit fitted (at the cost of $100) and went to great pains to write a sophisticated and well-researched speech. His new suit was of little impact, as the suit still fit the massive and lanky Lincoln poorly. But his speech proved to be very well written.

By the time Lincoln got to New York, he had learned that the speech would instead be sponsored by the Young Men's Central Republican Union and would now be given at the eponymous Cooper Union. Lincoln hurriedly re-wrote his speech for a less religious audience. The new audience proved to be very useful for Lincoln, as it now included Horace Greeley, who had the power to act as a presidential king-maker and was on a campaign to prevent the presidential nomination of his longtime friend, and now sworn rival, William H. Seward. 

Lincoln was the third speaker in a series, going after Frank Blair (who would later serve as an advisor to Lincoln) and abolitionist Cassius M. Clay. New York Evening Post editor William Cullen Bryant provided a warm introduction. Lincoln's ungainly appearance, ill-fitting suit, and shrill voice gave an initially poor impression to listeners, but he soon warmed up, and his oratory improved. The clarity and logic of his speech quickly wiped away any doubts the audience had.

Summary

Lincoln's speech has three major parts, each building towards his conclusion. The first part concerns the founders and the legal positions they supported on the question of slavery in the territories. The second part is addressed to the voters of the Southern states by clarifying the issues between Republicans and Democrats. He rebukes claims made by the Democrats that they are "conservative", arguing instead that the Republicans' position on slavery is in fact the "conservative" policy, as Lincoln claims it coincides with the views of the American founding fathers, who he said opposed slavery. By supporting slavery, Lincoln claims that the Democrats are in opposition to the teachings of the founding fathers and "reject, and scout, and spit upon that old policy, and insist upon substituting something new." The final section is addressed to Republicans.

In the first section, in response to a statement by Illinois Democrat Stephen A. Douglas, Lincoln asks rhetorically, "What is the frame of government under which we live?" He answers that it "must be: 'The Constitution of the United States. From there, he begins his reasoning on why the federal government can regulate slavery in the federal territories (but not states), especially resting on the character of the founders, and how they thought of slavery:

In the second part, in which he uses the prosopopoeia of a mock debate between Republicans and the South, Lincoln denies that Republicans are a "sectional" party, representing only the North and helping to incite slave rebellions. He rebukes the Southern Democrats' accusation that Republicans helped John Brown by saying, "John Brown was no Republican; and you have failed to implicate a single Republican in his Harper's Ferry enterprise." He addressed the single-mindedness of the Southern Democrats:

He also tried to show that the Southern Democrats' demand to secede from the Union if a Republican were to be elected president was like armed robbery: "the threat of destruction to the Union, to extort my vote, can scarcely be distinguished in principle" from that of a robber.But you will not abide the election of a Republican president! In that supposed event, You say, you will destroy the Union; and then, you say, the great crime of having destroyed it will be upon us! That is cool. A highwayman holds a pistol to my ear, and mutters through his teeth, "Stand and deliver, or I shall kill you, and then you will be a murderer!"The third section, addressed to fellow Republicans, encourages level-headed thinking and cool actions, doing "nothing through passion and ill temper":

Lincoln states that the only thing that will convince the Southerners is to "cease to call slavery wrong, and join them in calling it right", supporting all their runaway slave laws and the expansion of slavery. He ends by saying that Republicans, if they cannot end slavery where it exists, must fight through their votes to prevent its expansion. He ends with a call to duty:

Key excerpts

Section addressed to "Mr. President and fellow citizens of New York"

Section addressed "to the Southern people"

Section addressed "to Republicans"

Legacy

Lincoln scholar Harold Holzer called the Cooper Union address "Lincoln's watershed, the event that transformed him from a regional leader into a national phenomenon. Here the politician known as frontier debater and chronic jokester introduced a new oratorical style: informed by history, suffused with moral certainty, and marked by lawyerly precision."

Holzer wrote about Lincoln's speech in New York City:

Writing about his visit to Lincoln's speech place at Cooper Union and the meaning of this place for Lincoln's career and legacy, Holzer states that "only at the Great Hall of Cooper Union can audiences so easily inhale Lincoln's presence too—there to imagine not the dying but the living man, not the bearded icon of myth but the clean-shaven, fresh-voiced political original who conquered all New York here on the way to the White House and immortality."

David Herbert Donald considers the speech to be a masterful political move. Delivered in the home state of William H. Seward, who was the favored candidate for the 1860 election, and attended by Greeley, now an enemy of Seward, the speech put Lincoln in the ideal position to challenge for the nomination. Lincoln used the speech to show that the Republican party was a party of moderates, not crazed fanatics as the South and Democrats claimed. Afterwards, Lincoln was in much demand for speaking engagements. He travelled on a tour of New Hampshire, Connecticut and Rhode Island, repeating his arguments of the speech. The speech may have been a critical factor in ensuring his election.

References

External links

 Full text of the speech
 Summary of Lincoln's Arguments at Cooper Union
 Recording of the speech from eJunto.com
 Text of the speech from American Rhetoric.com
 Recording of the speech performed by Sam Waterston

1860 in politics
1860 in the United States
1860 speeches
Speeches by Abraham Lincoln
Cooper Union
1860 in New York (state)
February 1860 events